The  was a field army of the Imperial Japanese Army (IJA) during World War II. It was originally the 14th Army, formed on November 6, 1941 for the upcoming invasion of the Philippines. It was reorganized in the Philippines on July 28, 1944, when Allied landings were considered imminent. (An IJA "area army" was equivalent to a field army in other militaries, while an IJA "army" was a smaller, corps-level formation.)

History
The Japanese 14th Army was formed on November 6, 1941, under the Southern Expeditionary Army Group for the specific task of invading and occupying the Philippines. It initially consisted of the IJA 16th Division, 48th Division, 56th Division, and 65th Independent Mixed Infantry Brigade. In January 1942, the 48th Division was detached and reassigned to the Japanese Sixteenth Army for the invasion of the Netherlands East Indies, and was replaced with the Fourth Division. As the army was still fighting in the Philippines, its commanding officer, Lieutenant General Masaharu Homma, requested more reinforcements. The 10th Independent Garrison was sent to the Philippines as was the 21st Division Infantry Group, and the First Field Artillery Headquarters to command the field artillery units. The Fourth and Seventh Tank Regiments were part of the 14th Army, as well as the First, Eighth, and 16th Field Artillery Regiments and the 9th Independent Field Artillery Battalion. This army was responsible for the Bataan Death March after the surrender of US and Filipino forces in Bataan, and the 65th Independent Brigade was also accused of the Mariveles Massacre.

The 14th Army came under the direct control of Imperial General Headquarters in June, 1942; however, the Southern Expeditionary Army Group in Saigon continued to issue orders, at times in conflict with those received from Tokyo, and the 14th's commanding officer was plagued by insubordination from junior officers who used the situation to issue orders without his approval, or to countermand orders with which they did not agree. In August 1942, Homma was replaced by Lieutenant General Shizuichi Tanaka.

In July 1942 the 4th Division came under control of the 14th Army, as did the 30th Division, which was assigned to the defense of Mindanao. As the war situation continued to deteriorate for Japan, and Allied forces prepared to invade the Philippines, the 14th Army restructured its independent infantry brigades and reserves to form the new 100th, 102nd, 103rd, and 105th Divisions.

In March 1944 the 14th Army officially reverted to the control of the Southern Expeditionary Army Group. On July 28, 1944, the Japanese 14th Army officially became the Japanese 14th Area Army. Two more divisions (the 8th Division and the 10th Division) arrived in August 1944 as reinforcements, and also in August the 35th Army came under its control. On October 10, 1944, General Tomoyuki Yamashita assumed the command of the 14th Area Army to defend the Philippines. In the various battles of the Philippines campaign (1944–45) against combined American and Philippine Commonwealth armed forces in Leyte, Mindanao and parts of Luzon, the Japanese 14th Area Army suffered over 350,000 casualties, including virtually all of the 18,000 men of the 16th Infantry Division in the Battle of Leyte.

Troops of the 14th Area Army were responsible for the Palawan Massacre of December 14, 1944.

List of commanders

Commanding officer

Chief of staff

Structure

 Japanese 14th Area Army (1945)
 1st Infantry Division
 10th Infantry Division
 19th Infantry Division
 23rd Infantry Division
 26th Infantry Division
 103rd Infantry Division
 105th Infantry Division
 2nd Tank Division
 4th Air Division
 IJA 1st Special Forces Division
 68th Independent Infantry Brigade
 55th Independent Mixed Brigade
 58th Independent Mixed Brigade
 Japanese 35th Army
 16th Infantry Division
 30th Infantry Division
 100th Infantry Division
 102nd Infantry Division
 54th Independent Mixed Brigade
 Japanese 41st Army
 8th Infantry Division
 39th Independent Mixed Brigade
 65th Independent Infantry Brigade
 9th Artillery Headquarters

References

Books

External links

Notes 

14
Military units and formations established in 1942
Military units and formations disestablished in 1945